Stem cell proteomics is an omics that analyzes the proteomes of stem cells. Comparing different stem cell proteomes can reveal proteins that are important for stem cell differentiation.

See also
Stem cell genomics

Stem cells
Proteomics